The 2010 Nigeria Entertainment Awards was the 5th edition of the ceremony and was held on 18 September 2010. The event took place at BMCC Tribeca Performing Art Center, New York City. Omawumi and Dagrin led the nomination list with 5 and 4 awards respectively.

Awards
 Best Album of the Year
Mushin 2 Mohits - Wande Coal
CEO- Da Grin
Wonder Woman - Omawumi
Unstoppable - Tuface

 Hottest Single of the Year
"Kondo" - Da Grin
"Kokoroko" - Kefee ft. timaya
"Omoba" - D Prince
"Free Madness" - Terry G
"Bad" - Wande Coal

 Best New Act of the Year
Jaywon
D'Prince
Jesse Jagz
Lami
Omawumi

 Gospel Artist of the Year
Kenny Saint Brown
Kefee
Bouqui
Lara George
Kore

 Indigenous Artist of the Year
Asa
Nneka
9ice
Pasuma
Jesse King

 Best Pop/R&B Artist of the Year
Banky W
Wande Coal
Chuddy K
Omawumi
P-Square

 Best Rap Act of the Year
Jesse Jagz
Modenine
M.I.
Da’Grin
Naeto C

 Best Soul/Neo Soul Act of the Year
Tuface
Lami
Eva Alordiah
Nneka
Toba Gold

 Best Collaboration with Vocals
"Born Champion" - Pype ft. Dagrin, Vector, Naeto C, Sasha & GT
"Kokoroko" - Kefee ft Timaya
"E No Easy" - P-Square ft J Martins
"Nobody" - Tuface ft M.I.
"Thank God" - DaGrin ft Omawumi

 Best International Artist
Wale
Keno
JJC
Kas
Moeazy

 Music Producer of the Year
Don Jazzy
So Sick
J. Sleek
Dokta Frabz
Cobhams

 Best International Producer of the Year
Kid Konnect
Dogmites
JJC
Mictunes

 Best Male Music Video of the Year (Artist & Director)
"One day" - eLDee (eLDee)
"Fall in Love" - Dbanj (Sesan)
"Implication" - Tuface (unknown)
"Lagos Party" - Banky W (Kemi Adetiba)
"E no easy" - P Square ft. J. Martins (Jude Okoye)

 Best Female Music Video of the Year (Artist & Director)
"You know it" - Goldie (Clarence Peters)
"Today na Today"- Omawumi (Kemi Adetiba)
"If u want Me" - Mocheddah (Clarence Peters)
"Know- Lami (Brandon)
"Kokoroko" - Kefee ft. Timaya (Wudland)

 Best Actor in a Film/Short Story
Ramsey Noauh - Guilty Pleasures (2009 film)
Jim Iyke - The Shepherd / Dream Maker
Femi Adebayo - Ifederu
Desmond Elliot - Before the Light
Kayode Akinbayo - Bi a ti ko

 Best Actress in a Film/Short Story
Nse Ikpe Etim – Reloaded (2009 film)
Ini Edo - Native Son
Genevieve Nnaji- Silent Scandals
Stephanie Okereke -Nnenda
Omotola Jalade - Deepest of Dreams

 Best Film (Director)
The Figurine - Kunle Afolayan
Guilty Pleasures (2009 film) - Daniel Adenimokan and Desmond Elliot
Nnenda - Izu Ojukwu
Silent Scandals - T.K. Falope
Behind a Smile - Frank Rajah Arase

 Best Actress in TV Series/Reality/Game Show
 Genevieve Nnaji - Guinness Ultimate Survivor (Celebrity edition)
 Bimbo Akintola - Circle of 3
 Kate Henshaw-Nuttal - Circle of 3
 Damilola Adegbite - Tinsel 
 Funlola Aofiyebi-Raimi - Tinsel

 Best Actor in TV Series/Reality/Game Show
 Frank Edohor - Who wants to be a Millionaire
 Kayode Peters - Flat Mates
 Gideon Okeke - Tinsel

 Best On-Screen Personality (People's Choice Awards) 
Denrele
Ill
Andre blaze
Dorisha brick George
Adaure Achumba

 Best TV Series/Reality Show/ Game Show
Half Sisters
Circle 3
Tinsel
Star QuestGulder Ultimate Search''

International Event of the Year (Promoter)
 Thisday Music Festival
 UK Naija Carnival
 Arise Fashion Week New York
 Ovation Red Carol
 Miss Nigeria in America

 Best World DJ
DJ DeeMoney
DJ MightyMike
DJ Vinny
DJ Stramborrella
DJ Ike
DJ Xclusive

 Best Radio Personality 
Rhythm 93.7 FM - Ik (Wild Child)
The Beat 99.9 FM - Toolz
Top Radio - Tosyn Buknor
The Beat 99.9 FM - Olisa Adibua
Inspiration fm - Dan Foster

 Best Comedian
Seyi Law
Wale Gate
Jedi
AY
I Go Die

 Fashion Designer of the Year
Deola Sagoe
Alvins
Momo couture
Adebayo jones
Ouch!

 Entertainment Personality of the Year
Nduka Obiagbena
Cecil Hammond
Keke and D1
Dele Momodu
Obi Asika

 Most Promising Act to Watch
Chuddy K
D'Prince
Eva Alordiah
Femi Adeyinka
Mo'Cheddah

References

Nigeria Entertainment Awards
Nigeria Entertainment Awards
Ent 
Ent
Nigeria Entertainment Awards
Nigeria Entertainment Awards